Ysgol Gyfun Rhydywaun is a Welsh-medium comprehensive school in the Cynon Valley in the village of Penywaun, Rhondda Cynon Taf, Wales, to the northwest of the town of Aberdare.

The school was established on 1 September 1995. It provides a Welsh-medium education for pupils from the Cynon Valley and from neighbouring Merthyr Tydfil County Borough, where there is no Welsh-medium secondary school.

Houses 

Notable alumni 
 Andrew Coombs, Welsh rugby international
 Nathan Craze, British ice hockey international
 Thomas Young, Welsh rugby international

References

External links 
 

Secondary schools in Rhondda Cynon Taf
Welsh-language schools
Educational institutions established in 1995
1995 establishments in Wales
Aberdare